Victor Halberstadt (born 16 June 1939) is a Dutch economist.

Biography
Halberstadt was born on 16 June 1939, in Amsterdam, Netherlands. He was raised in a Jewish family and experienced the terrors of the Holocaust. From 1965 to 1974, Halberstadt was a senior lecturer of public sector finance at the University of Amsterdam. From 1971 to 1973, he was an adviser of the Directorate-General of the National Budget of the Dutch Ministry of Finance. On 9 September 1974, he was appointed professor of public sector finance of the University of Leiden. In October 1981, he was along with economist Cees de Galan appointed an informer to mediate the 1981 Dutch Cabinet crisis.

Halberstadt has held several positions, including Crown Member of the Social-Economic Council (1972–2004), honorary secretary-general of the Bilderberg Group (1980–2000), president of the International Institute of Public Finance (1987–1990), director of Concertgebouw (1988–2011), member of the faculty of the World Economic Forum (1990–), member of the international advisory board of Goldman Sachs Group Inc (1991–), chairman of the Daimler-Chrysler international advisory board (1995–2005), member of the board of trustees of De Nederlandse Opera (2003–), member of the board of trustees of the Lee Kuan Yew School of Public Policy (2005–), and member of the board of trustees of the Boekman Foundation (2009–). Since 1990, Halberstadt has been a Knight of the Order of the Netherlands Lion. He is a member of the steering committee of the Bilderberg Group.

Philanthropy

Halberstadt is a member of the board of directors of the International Centre for Missing & Exploited Children (ICMEC), a global nonprofit organization that combats child sexual exploitation, child pornography, and child abduction.

References

1939 births
Living people
Dutch economists
Academic staff of the University of Amsterdam
Academic staff of Leiden University
DaimlerChrysler
Goldman Sachs people
Members of the Steering Committee of the Bilderberg Group
Knights of the Order of the Netherlands Lion